Arturo Aldunate Phillips (1902–1985) was a Chilean poet, civil engineer, mathematician, and researcher. He won the Chilean National Prize for Literature in 1976.

Works
 Era una sirena, poesía, 1921.
 El problema de las utilidades y la crisis económica actual, ensayo, 1934.
 El nuevo arte poético y Pablo Neruda, ensayo, 1936.
 Federico García Lorca a través de Margarita Xirgú, ensayo, 1937.
 Matemática y poesía, ensayo, 1940.
 Estados Unidos, gran aventura del hombre, ensayo, 1943.
 Pablo Neruda: selección, compilación, 1943.
 Un pueblo en busca de su destino, ensayo, 1947.
 Al encuentro del hombre, ensayo, 1953.
 Albert Einstein, el hombre y el filósofo, biografía, 1956.
 Quinta dimensión, ensayo, 1958.
 Los robots no tienen a Dios en el corazón, ensayo, 1963.
 Por las fronteras de la cibernética, ensayo, 1964.
 Una flecha en el aire y otros ensayos, 1965.
 A horcajadas en la luz, ensayo, 1969.
 Universo vivo, divulgación científica, 1970.
 Hombres, máquinas y estrellas, 1972.
 El amenazante año 2000, futurología, 1975.
 Chile mira hacia las estrellas, divulgación astronómica, 1975.
 Los caballos azules, sobre astronomía y otras ciencias, 1978.
 Mi pequeña historia de Pablo Neruda, 1979.
 Luz, sombra de Dios, acto de fe de un científico, 1982.

See also
Chilean literature

1902 births
1985 deaths
Chilean male poets
National Prize for Literature (Chile) winners
Chilean people of Basque descent
Chilean people of English descent
20th-century Chilean male writers
20th-century Chilean poets